Ultimate X: The Movie is a 2002 documentary film based on the 2001 X Games.

It features athletes including Dave Mirra, Travis Pastrana, Mike Metzger, Bucky Lasek, Brian Deegan, and Mat Hoffman. It also features clips from the actual event in Philly, including the finals between Bob Burnquist, and Bucky Lasek, which Bob won by a first ever score of 98, and the crash of Carey Hart, when he attempted the first ever Moto-X Backflip.

Songs featured in the movie

 "Paranoid" by Black Sabbath
 "No Light" by 3rd Strike
 "Alive" by P.O.D.
 "Learn to Fly" by Foo Fighters
 "In Too Deep" by Sum 41 (heard during the end credits)
 "Who's on Your Side" by Pennywise
 "Heaven is a Halfpipe" by OPM

Interviewees
• Tony Hawk
• Travis Pastrana
• Dave Mirra
• T.J. Lavin
• Bucky Lasek
• Jason Ellis (radio host)
• Brian Deegan
• Ryan Nyquist
• Bob Burnquist
• Mat Hoffman
• Selema Masekela
• Carey Hart
• Cory "Nasty" Nastazio 
• Stephen Murray

References

External links

Ultimate X: The Movie at AllMovie

2002 films
2000s English-language films
2002 short documentary films
American sports documentary films
American short documentary films
Touchstone Pictures films
Films directed by Bruce Hendricks
2002 directorial debut films
X Games
Films shot in Philadelphia
Films set in Philadelphia
Films set in 2001
2000s American films